The 1966 WANFL season was the 82nd season of the various incarnations of the Western Australian National Football League.

Ladder

Finals

Grand Final

References

External links
Official WAFL website
Western Australian National Football League (WANFL), 1966

West Australian Football League seasons
WANFL